Colegiata de San Pedro de Teverga is a church in Asturias, Spain.

See also
Asturian art
Catholic Church in Spain

References

External links

Churches in Asturias
Roman Catholic churches in Spain
Bien de Interés Cultural landmarks in Asturias